XML log or XML logging is used by many computer programs to log the programs operations. An XML logfile records a description of the operations done by a program during its session. The log normally includes: timestamp, the programs settings during the operation, what was completed during the session, the files or directories used and any errors that may have occurred. In computing, a logfile records either events that occur in an operating system or other software running. It may also log messages between different users of a communication software. XML file standard is controlled by the World Wide Web Consortium as the XML file standard is used for many other data standards, see List of XML markup languages. XML is short for eXtensible Markup Language file.

See also
 List of XML markup languages
 List of XML schemas
 Comparison of data serialization formats
 Binary XML
 EBML
 WBXML
 XHTML
 XML Protocol

References

External links

 W3C XML homepage
 XML 1.0 Specification
 Retrospective on Extended Reference Concrete Syntax by Rick Jelliffe
 XML, Java and the Future of the Web (1997) by Jon Bosak
 http://validator.w3.org/ The Official [W3C] Markup Validation Service
 The XML FAQ originally for the W3C's XML SIG by Peter Flynn

Computer file formats
Computer logging
Markup languages
Open formats